Mount Keith Airport  is located at Mount Keith Mine, Western Australia and is operated by BHP.

See also
 List of airports in Western Australia
 Aviation transport in Australia

References

External links
Airservices Aerodromes & Procedure Charts

Airports in Western Australia
Mid West (Western Australia)